The phrase "apple of my eye" refers in English to something or someone that one cherishes above all others. Originally, the phrase was simply an idiom referring to the pupil of the eye.

Origin 

Originally this term simply referred to the "aperture at the centre of the human eye", i.e. the pupil, or occasionally to the whole eyeball. The earliest appearance of the term is found in the ninth-century Old English translation of the Latin Cura pastoralis attributed to Alfred the Great.

The sense "pupil" appears to be the meaning Shakespeare used in his 1590s play A Midsummer Night's Dream. In the play, the fairy character Robin Goodfellow has acquired a flower that was once hit by Cupid's arrow, imbuing it with magical love-arousing properties, and drops juice of this flower into a young sleeping man's eyes, saying "Flower of this purple dye, / Hit with Cupid's archery, / Sink in apple of his eye".

Use in the Bible
The phrase "apple of my eye" (or similar) occurs in several places in the King James Bible translation from 1611, and some subsequent translations:
 : "He found him in a desert land, and in the waste howling wilderness; he led him about, he instructed him, he kept him as the apple of his eye".
 : "Keep me as the apple of the eye, hide me under the shadow of thy wings".
 : "Keep my commandments, and live; and my law as the apple of thine eye".
 : "Their heart cried unto the Lord, O wall of the daughter of Zion, let tears run down like a river day and night: give thyself no rest; let not the apple of thine eye cease".
 : "For thus saith the LORD of hosts; After the glory hath he sent me unto the nations which spoiled you: for he that toucheth you toucheth the apple of his eye".
However, the "apple" usage comes from English idiom, not Biblical Hebrew. The original Hebrew for this idiom, in all but Zechariah 2:8, was 'iyshown 'ayin (אישון עין).  The expression refers to the pupil, and probably simply means "dark part of the eye" (other biblical passages use 'iyshown with the meaning dark or obscure, and having nothing whatsoever to do with the eye). There is, however, a popular notion that 'iyshown is a diminutive of "man" ('iysh), so that the expression would literally mean "Little Man of the Eye"; if so, this would be consistent with a range of languages, in which the etymology of the word for pupil has this meaning.

In Zechariah 2:8, the Hebrew phrase used is bava 'ayin (בבה עין). The meaning of bava is disputed. It may mean "apple"; if so, the phrase used in Zechariah 2:8 literally refers to the "apple of the eye". However, Hebrew scholars generally regard this phrase as simply referring to the "eyeball".

References

Citations

Sources

Transactions and Proceedings of the American Philological Association, Vol. 73, 1942

English phrases
Biblical phrases
Metaphors referring to food and drink
Human eyes in culture
Human pupil